Lodha Park is a 18.5-acre luxury residential skyscraper project which has been developed by the Lodha Group in the upscale Worli neighborhood of Mumbai, Maharastra, India.
The land for the project was purchased from DLF Limited in 2012 for 2,800 Crore approximately. Lodha Park consists of 5 towers which stand at a height of 268 meters with 76 floors each.

Developer 

The Lodha Group is a real estate development company into residential and commercial construction projects in Mumbai, Pune, and Hyderabad. They are the developers of World One, a residential skyscraper in Mumbai, and is the tallest completed building in India.

Location 

Lodha Park is located on the Pandurang Budhkar Marg in Worli. Bandra Kurla Complex and Nariman Point the Mumbai business districts are in close proximity. High Street Phoenix, shopping malls, and PVR Cinemas are with in a driving distance.

Project launch 
In September, the real estate company announced that Aishwarya Rai Bachchan is the brand ambassador for this project. It has also been reported that the actress has bought a 4-BHK residence in the project worth more than 5 crores. After a billion dollar pre-launch, Lodha Group launched Lodha Park project in September and it got bookings worth 2,500 crores on Day 1. A launch was then spread across Dubai and in 6 Indian cities Mumbai, New Delhi, Kolkata, Pune, Ahmedabad, and Surat. There was an interest from overseas buyers and applications to book property were received from NRI's in the UAE and USA.

Features
Lodha Park includes premium residential and commercial developments, hotel rooms, retail stores, Club House, and a restaurant. The project includes 7 acres of green landscapes set on top of a 70 feet tall ‘hill’ which is Inspired by the urban parks around the world. This project will generate more than 5,000 direct jobs, including 1,000 white collar jobs like those of architects, engineers, and interior designers. This large development will also support more than 10,000 indirect jobs in allied industries like cement, steel, tiles, cables, etc. Once The Park is completed, it will give rise to over 500 full-time jobs in the areas of facility management, housekeeping, horticulture, and retail. The project would be integrating Evander Holyfield gym within the complex. 'Trump Tower Mumbai' which is 879 feet high tower with three and four bedroom apartments is part of the project, which Lodha Group has construct with Donald Trump's Trump Organization after signing a brand licensing deal in August 2014.

See also
List of tallest buildings in India
List of tallest buildings in Mumbai
Trump Towers Pune

References

External links 

 Official website

Residential real estate
Buildings and structures in Mumbai
Residential buildings in India
The Trump Organization